Alexander Chepakovich is a web developer, engineer, entrepreneur and finance practitioner. He is the founder of X-FIN.com.

During his career Chepakovich worked at Gomel Power Plant 2, General Electric Company, Alstom, Bank of Canada, ABN Amro Bank, Commerzbank, and Edward Jones.

In finance, Chepakovich is author of the Chepakovich valuation model. In engineering, he has done an original research study on single- and two-phase transient jets created by diesel engine injectors. This was part of a work undertaken by a team of graduate students and research engineers led by Professor Philip Hill at the University of British Columbia's Department of Mechanical Engineering, which become the basis of Westport HD technology used by Westport Innovations in its products.

References

Living people
1963 births
CFA charterholders